NA-252 Loralai-cum-Musakhel-cum-Duki-cum-Barkhan is a newly created constituency for the National Assembly of Pakistan. It comprises the districts of Loralai, Musakhel, Ziarat, Duki and Harnai from the province of Balochistan.

Assembly Segments

Members of Parliament

2018-2022: NA-258 Loralai-cum-Musakhel-cum-Ziarat-cum-Duki-cum-Harnai

Election 2018 

General elections were held on 25 July 2018.

See also
NA-251 Killa Saifullah-cum-Zhob-cum-Sherani
NA-253 Harnai-cum-Sibbi-cum-Kohlu-cum-Dera Bugti

References 

National Assembly Constituencies of Pakistan